The Winston-Salem Polar Twins were a minor league professional ice hockey team, based in Winston-Salem, North Carolina. The team was a founding member of the Southern Hockey League in 1973, and played home games at the Winston-Salem Memorial Coliseum. The initial owners of the team were a group of 15 investors, led by Ed Timmerman and Eldridge Hanes. In the 1973–74 season, Winstom-Salem finished fourth place, and lost in the first round of the playoffs under player-coach Don Carter. In 1974, Forbes Kennedy was brought in to coach, and improved results two years in a row, despite losing in the first round of the playoffs both seasons. In December 1975, the Polar Twins were sold to Jim Crockett Jr. Player-coach Ron Anderson took over in the fourth season, and the team was in last place in January. On January 7, 1977, during the team's fourth season, Crockett announced he was folding the team.

Major league affiliations
The Polar Twins were affiliated with the World Hockey Association in the 1973–74 season, and with the National Hockey League from 1974 to 1977.

Notable players
Notable Polar Twins players that also played in the National Hockey League or World Hockey Association:

Ron Anderson
Randy Andreachuk
Ron Ashton
Bernie Blanchette
Bob Boyd
Ken Brown
Brian Carlin
Bob Champoux
Howie Colborne
Roger Cote
Gary Cunningham
Brian Derksen
Gary Doyle
Bob Fitchner
Derek Harker
Rich Hart
Don Herriman
Greg Holst
Jim Jones
Dennis Kassian
Jamie Kennedy
Bill Laing
Rick Lalonde
John Mazur
Bob McAneeley
Jim McCrimmon
Bill Morris
Jim Murray
Terry Ryan
Blaine Rydman
Ron Serafini
Danny Sullivan
Jim Watt
Don Wheldon
Bill Young

Results
Season-by-season results:

Franchise leaders
All-time and season leaders:

All-time regular season
Games played: Bill Morris, 186
Goals scored: Ken Gassoff, 83
Assists: Ken Gassoff, 135
Points: Ken Gassoff, 218
Penalty minutes: Brian Molvik, 318

Single-season records
Goals scored: Bernie Blanchette, 39 (1973–74)
Assists: John Campbell, 59 (1975–76)
Points: John Campbell, 92 (1975–76)
Penalty minutes: Ron Fogal, 248 (1974–75)

Postseason records
Goals scored: Bill Morris, 6 (1974)
Assists: Bill Morris, 8 (1974)
Points: Bill Morris, 14 (1974)
Penalty minutes: Greg Holst, 42 (1975)

References

1973 establishments in North Carolina
1977 disestablishments in North Carolina
Defunct ice hockey teams in the United States
Detroit Red Wings minor league affiliates
Edmonton Oilers minor league affiliates
Ice hockey teams in North Carolina
Ice hockey clubs established in 1973
Ice hockey clubs disestablished in 1977
Jersey Knights minor league affiliates
New York Golden Blades minor league affiliates
New York Rangers minor league affiliates
Southern Hockey League (1973–1977) teams
Sports in Winston-Salem, North Carolina
St. Louis Blues minor league affiliates